Enterolactone is a organic compound classified as an enterolignan. It is formed by the action of intestinal bacteria on plant lignan precursors present in the diet.

Sources 
Many dietary plant lignan precursors, such as secoisolariciresinol, matairesinol, lariciresinol, pinoresinol, and sesamin, can be metabolized by gut microbes to enterolactone. In edible plants lignans are bound to the fiber fraction and therefore fiber-rich food products, such as cereals, vegetables, fruits and berries, are generally good sources of lignans and enterolactone. The richest known dietary sources of enterolactone precursors are flaxseed and sesame seed. Since enterolactone is produced by specific species of gut microbiota, the capacity to produce it varies between people. Antibiotic treatments can abolish the capacity to produce enterolactone. It may take up to a year before enterolactone production is restored.

Health effects 
Enterolactone is suggested to possess beneficial health effects in humans. In epidemiological studies lower concentrations of enterolactone have been observed in breast cancer patients compared to healthy controls, which may suggest that enterolactone is anti-carcinogenic. Enterolactone and lignans may also be protective against cardiovascular disease.

References 

Lignans
Tetrahydrofurans
Lactones
Phytoestrogens
Polyphenols